The Wonderful Year is a 1921 British silent drama film directed by Kenelm Foss and starring Randle Ayrton, Mary Odette and Margot Drake.

Cast
 Randle Ayrton as The Happiness Dispenser  
 Hubert Carter as Bigourdin  
 Margot Drake as Corinna Hastings  
 Lionelle Howard as Martin Openshaw  
 Mary Odette as Felise  
 Frank Stanmore as Polydor 
 Gwen Williams as Lucilla

References

Bibliography
 Low, Rachael. History of the British Film, 1918-1929. George Allen & Unwin, 1971.

External links

1921 films
1921 romantic drama films
British silent feature films
British romantic drama films
Films directed by Kenelm Foss
British black-and-white films
Films based on British novels
1920s English-language films
1920s British films
Silent romantic drama films